Sadangi is a village in Kendujhar District  in the Indian state of Odisha. It is the administrative headquarters of the Kendujhar district.

Geography

Sadangi is a landlocked village situated in the northern part of Keonjhar, surrounded by Jyotipur panchayat of Jyotipur in the north, Jajapasi in the south,  Unchabali and Bhanda in the west and Turumunga in the east.

Demographics
 India census, Kendujhar (Keonjhar) District : Census 2011 data

Sadangi village overview

An official Census 2011 detail of Sadangi, a village of Keonjhar has been released by Directorate of Census Operations in Orissa. Enumeration of key persons was also done by census officials in Kendujhar District of Orissa.

Education
 School and college in sadangi GP include:
 Sadangi UP school
 Sadangi M.E school
 M.K.G High school, sadangi
 M.K.G college, sadangi

Places to visit
Sadangi Shiv Mandir
Hanuman Temple

References

Torch Bearers of Vedic Traditions: Brahmin Sasan Villages in Orissa by Nityananda Patnaik. Vedam Books, New Delhi, Classical, 2002, ix, 227 p. 

Hindu surnames
Social groups of Odisha